Dwight Watson may refer to:

 Dwight Watson (farmer) (born 1952), tobacco farmer who drove a tractor into Washington, D.C. and claimed to have explosives
 Dwight Watson (American football) (1871–1920), American football player and coach